The 1999–2000 Israeli Hockey League season was the ninth season of Israel's hockey league. Five teams participated in the league, and HC Ma'alot won the championship.

Regular season

Playoffs

Semifinals
 HC Maccabi Amos Lod - HC Bat Yam 6:3
 HC Ma’alot - HC Metulla 9:3

Final 
 HC Maccabi Amos Lod - HC Ma’alot 4:6

External links 
 Season on hockeyarchives.info

Israeli League
Israeli League (ice hockey) seasons
Seasons